IKAR is a  post-denominational Jewish congregation and community founded in Los Angeles and led by Rabbi Sharon Brous.

IKAR ("essence" in Hebrew) was founded in 2004 by Brous along with  Melissa Balaban and others, including David N. Myers, Andrea Blaugrund Nevins and Daniel Sokatch.  Its membership includes Eric Garcetti, the former mayor of Los Angeles.

IKAR's musical director is Hillel Tigay.

References

External links

Non-denominational Judaism
Jewish religious organizations
Synagogues in Los Angeles
Jewish organizations established in 2004
2004 establishments in California